Wang Enmao (May 19, 1913 – April 12, 2001) was a People's Liberation Army lieutenant general and a People's Republic of China politician. He was born in Yongxin County, Jiangxi Province. He was twice Chinese Communist Party Committee Secretary of Xinjiang. He was Chinese Communist Party Committee Secretary and governor of Jilin.

People's Liberation Army generals from Jiangxi
People's Republic of China politicians from Jiangxi
Chinese Communist Party politicians from Jiangxi
Politicians from Ji'an
Governors of Jilin
Political office-holders in Jilin
Political office-holders in Xinjiang
1913 births
2001 deaths
People of the Republic of China
Vice Chairpersons of the National Committee of the Chinese People's Political Consultative Conference